Joseph Miller (September 9, 1819 – May 27, 1862) was an American lawyer and politician who served as a U.S. Representative from Ohio for one term from 1857 to 1859.

Biography 
Born in Virginia, Miller attended the common schools.
He moved to Ohio and settled in Chillicothe.
He was graduated from Miami University, Oxford, Ohio, in 1839.
He studied law.

He was admitted to the bar in 1841 and commenced practice in Chillicothe, Ohio.

He served as prosecuting attorney of Ross County, Ohio, from 1844 to 1848.
He served as member of the State house of representatives in 1856.

Congress 
Miller was elected as a Democrat to the Thirty-fifth Congress (March 4, 1857 – March 3, 1859).
He was an unsuccessful candidate for reelection in 1858 to the Thirty-sixth Congress.
He was appointed United States judge for Nebraska Territory March 5, 1859.

Death
He died in Cincinnati, Ohio, on May 27, 1862.
He was interred in Grandview Cemetery, Chillicothe, Ross County, Ohio, USA.

Sources

1819 births
1862 deaths
People from Virginia
Miami University alumni
Politicians from Chillicothe, Ohio
Ohio lawyers
County district attorneys in Ohio
19th-century American politicians
19th-century American lawyers
Democratic Party members of the United States House of Representatives from Ohio